Skylanders is a toys-to-life action-adventure video game series published by Activision. Skylanders games are played by placing character figures called the Skylanders on the "Portal of Power", a device that reads the figures' tags through NFC and "imports" the character represented by the figure into the game as a playable character.

Plot 
The game takes place in a world called Skylands, a realm filled with adventure and floating islands. It is the center of the universe where it is constantly threatened by evil forces who seek to rule Skylands and gain access to all worlds. A band of heroes called the Skylanders use their abilities and machinery to defend their world from various threats, which they have done for generations. They have worked with the Portal Masters in keeping peace and balance in Skylands, battling the forces of evil, and protecting the Core of Light. Kaos, the main antagonist, has destroyed the Core of Light and Skylands is in his hands. It is up to the player to send the Skylanders into the game and stop Kaos. The Skylanders have an unbreakable bond with their Portal Masters. Each Skylander is associated with one of the ten elements of Skylands: Earth, Air, Fire, Water, Magic, Tech, Life, Undead, Light, and Dark. The main plot is the Skylanders going through levels to defeat Kaos, and stop him from ruling over Skylands. The console versions of each game follow identical storylines, while the Nintendo 3DS versions follow stories different from those of the console versions.

Games

Spyro's Adventure (2011) 

This is the first edition of the Skylanders franchise. There are 32 Skylanders in the game, four Skylanders for all eight elements. Skylanders are able to open gates of their element, which are found throughout the game. Here the main goal of the Skylanders is to restore the light core that was  destroyed by Kaos by collecting the Eternal Sources of each element and other components.

Giants (2012) 

Giants is the second installment in the Skylanders series set as a direct sequel to Spyro's Adventure. It introduces a new team of Skylanders called the Giants, massive creatures who were the first Skylanders assembled to stop the reign of Arkeyans. Unlike the other Skylanders, the Giants can lift, throw, and destroy trees and rocks as well. The players use the Giants when Kaos found a way to reactivate the Arkeyan Conquertron and tries to takeover Skylands by rising the Arkeyans.

Swap Force (2013) 

Swap Force is the third installment in the franchise. Taking place in another part of Skylands called the Cloudbreak Islands, the player takes control of a new group of Skylanders called the Swap Force who hold the ability to swap top and bottom halves and abilities. Together, the Swap Force and the Skylanders fight Kaos and his mother from ruining the performance of Mount Cloudbreak.

Trap Team (2014) 

Trap Team is the fourth installment in the franchise. It introduces the Trap Masters and the Trap mechanic, which allows players to trap in-game enemies in element-specific Elemental Traps which are shards of a special kind of crystal known as Traptanium. The trapped enemies can then be summoned as playable characters for a limited time, except in the main hub, where they can be played for an unlimited amount of time. The Skylanders and the Trap Masters used this trapping advantage to stop Kaos and the Doom Raiders. They also introduced two new elements, those being the Light and Dark elements.

SuperChargers (2015) 

SuperChargers is the fifth installment in the series. It introduces a new group of Skylanders called the SuperChargers who pilot special vehicles (Land, Sky and Sea) that allow the Skylanders to create rifts to travel through, like portals, while stopping Kaos who’s created The Sky Eater powered by The Darkness which has plans of its own. Two characters exclusive to the Nintendo console versions are Mario franchise characters Donkey Kong and Bowser as Turbo Charge Donkey Kong and Hammer Slam Bowser, along with their respective vehicles, the Barrel Blaster and Clown Cruiser. The characters, but not their vehicles, which were made exclusively for the game, also function as amiibo figures. The Wii version of the game is titled Skylanders: SuperChargers Racing and does not have adventure segments from the Wii U and PS3 versions. The plot for this version is where the SuperChargers compete in a race sponsored by Pandergast and the winner will win a snow globe which will grant one wish. The Nintendo 3DS version also carries that same name and likewise focuses on the racing elements only. This was the last game to be released on tablets.

Imaginators (2016) 

A sixth game was released on October 13, 2016, in Australia and New Zealand, on October 14, 2016, in Europe and on October 16, 2016, in North America. In June 2016, Activision announced that the game would be titled Skylanders Imaginators, which allows players to create and customize their own Skylanders called Imaginators. With both theirs and the Senseis help the Skylanders try to stop Kaos who’s using mind magic to create Doomlanders with the help of an ancient Brain. The title was developed by Toys for Bob. Crash Bandicoot and Doctor Neo Cortex are guest stars as playable characters in the game, marking their first appearance in a video game since Crash Bandicoot Nitro Kart 2 in 2010. The figures for both were initially exclusive to the PlayStation 3 and PlayStation 4 starter packs (although they are playable on all consoles), but were released later on as a stand-alone double pack. Crash and Cortex appear as part of the Sensei Skylanders whose job is to train the Imaginators.

Version differences

Skylanders: Spyro's Adventure 
The version of Skylanders: Spyro's Adventure developed by Toys for Bob was designed for the Nintendo Wii, with a HD version made for the PlayStation 3, Xbox 360, PC and Wii U Version only in Japan. Many motion-controlled activities were consequentially reassigned button inputs for certain actions. It is also why Skylanders possess only three abilities and cannot jump in the earlier entries, due to the lack of buttons on the Wii Remote.

The Wii version features a New Game Plus option, which allows players to bypass most of the game's cutscenes and dialogue on a new file after beating the game. HD versions, however, require that the player watch most of the cutscenes and listen to all of the dialogue no matter what file is loaded.

On the Wii version, character portraits used in dialogue feature stylistic 2D artwork, whereas HD versions use 3D character models.

Depending on which console you are playing on the story scroll menu’s rune icons are different

There are also a number of mechanical differences. On HD versions of the game, collision mechanics with abilities like 'Hex's Wall of Bones' are different, such that partner Skylanders in co-op mode can be lifted by them and circumvent obstacles.

The Wii, PlayStation 3 and PC versions of Spyro's Adventure feature a wireless portal that includes a USB wireless connector. The portal requires AA batteries. The Xbox 360 version of Spyro's Adventure features a wired portal, an adaptation that was made when testers who were forwarded early copies of the game expressed their frustration with providing the portal with batteries. Every Skylanders installment thereafter featured a wired portal.

The 3DS version, developed by Vicarious Visions, is radically different from the Console and PC versions.  The 3DS version has no co-op functionality, and hence the starter pack includes a smaller Portal with an infrared reader that can connect to a 3DS system. The portal is powered with AAA batteries and has a USB port that allows it to function with the console versions of the game. It features a different plot and set of non-playable characters (with the exception of Eon). The three Skylanders included in the starter pack are also different, substituting the Toys for Bob version's 'Spyro', 'Gill Grunt' and 'Trigger Happy' for 'Ignitor', 'Stealth Elf' and 'Dark Spyro', a cosmetic variant of 'Spyro'. Players do not need to keep their Skylanders on the portal at all times like on the console versions, and instead 'load' two Skylanders into the game that they can alternate between, until a new Skylander is loaded in to replace it.

The Wii U version released July 12, 2013, and is the only Skylanders Game that released on a home console in Japan, the game is limited to 720p and runs at a higher frame rate compared to the other version.

Spin-offs 
In 2011, Activision released Skylanders Universe, an online browser-based multiplayer game that allowed players to interact with each other in Skylands, play minigames, customise their own island and log their Skylanders collection. Players could connect their portals to their computer to summon their Skylanders, much like in the core series. The service has since been discontinued.

Activision released seven Skylanders spin-off games on mobile devices. These titles include Cloud Patrol, Battlegrounds, Lost Islands, Collection Vault, Trap Team, SuperChargers (mobile port), Battlecast and Ring of Heroes.

Music 

Lorne Balfe has composed the soundtracks to all the Skylanders games thus far, while Hans Zimmer composed part of Spyro’s Adventure’s main theme. Imaginators does not use an original soundtrack, instead opting for a mix of stock music and pieces from previous games. An official soundtrack for Imaginators was also never released.

Media

Novels 
A series of books in the Skylanders franchise started with Skylanders: The Machine of Doom that takes place before the events of Spyro's Adventure. It was written by Cavan Scott, who would later write sequels to the novel under the Skylanders: The Mask of Power series, which also serve as prequels to Spyro's Adventure. Another series, Skylanders: Book of Elements would detail two elements in each installment, with Shubrik Bros. Creative writing the first and Barry Hutchson writing the rest.

Art Books 
Two art books, Strata: The Art of Skylanders: Swap Force and Clutch: The Art of Skylanders: Superchargers, were produced by Vicarious Visions. As employee exclusives, the only way to obtain them is through online sellers or charity events.

IDW Publishing 
IDW Publishing created a comic series associated with the Skylanders franchise that has events that take place in between the games. The series was reportedly cancelled in order to not conflict with Skylanders Academy, which used a different canon.

TV series 

In 2016, it was announced that Activision Blizzard Studios would produce an animated television series based on Skylanders. The first season debuted on Netflix on October 28, 2016, the second season on October 6, 2017, and the third and final season premiered on September 28, 2018. On April 30, 2019, it was announced that Skylanders Academy was cancelled.

Possible film 
Activision has commented on the possibility of a movie based on the Skylanders reboot as something that they could look into in the future. On May 6, 2014, Activision CEO Eric Hirshberg announced that the Activision team had an interest in "jumping on the film adaptation bandwagon" and adapting Skylanders into a film.

Future
Following the release of Imaginators, the franchise went into hiatus, with speculations surrounding a seventh console installment. Nevertheless, future projects within the "Skylanders" universe were limited to the recent mobile game titled "Ring of Heroes" until its closure in 2022. The studios remained dormant until "Activision Blizzard" was acquired by Microsoft in January 2022. Activision CEO Bobby Kotick stated that Microsoft had interest in reviving some of the old studios' hit franchises, including Guitar Hero and Skylanders.

Reception 

Skylanders: Spyro's Adventure received "generally favorable" reviews according to review aggregator Metacritic, with many praising the technological use of the "Portal of Power". Although some reviewers criticized the absence of online multiplayer, the toys for the Skylanders were widely praised. GameSpot gave it a 7.5 out of 10, praising its family-friendly gameplay and role-playing-style character progression, but criticized the lack of online multiplayer, the cost of buying a complete set of figures, the arbitrary inclusion of Spyro, and the unreliability of the Portal of Power peripheral. Nintendo World Report gave the game a 9 out of 10, praising the Wii version for its gameplay and production values, and the Nintendo 3DS version for its accessibility to younger gamers and overall design. Destructoid gave the game an 8 out of 10 saying, "It's not the most complex game on the market, but the innovative gadgetry and authentic thoughtfulness on the part of the developer stands out in a market so used to churning out the same old crap." Giant Bomb reviewer Jeff Gerstmann gave the game four out of five stars, stating "Skylanders is probably aimed at kids, but whatever. I am a legal adult...and I think it's still pretty cool." Skylanders: Spyro's Adventure was nominated for two Toy Industry Association awards: "Game of the Year" and "Innovative Toy of the Year."

Skylanders: Giants received "generally favorable" reviews on most platforms according to Metacritic; the Nintendo 3DS version received "mixed or average" reviews. However, the reviews in general were slightly lower than that of the previous game, especially for the Nintendo 3DS version, which received the lowest Metacritic score in the series. IGN gave the game an 8 out of 10 score, calling it a "...a more polished but by-the-numbers sequel that’s really fun to play". PlayStation Lifestyle, however, gave the game a lower score with a 70/100, saying, "The reality is that Skylanders: Giants is age-appropriate fun that harkens back to the delight you had collecting Pokémon cards or mashing your way through a dungeon crawler. If you've got little ones, then you already know the verdict here."

Skylanders: Swap Force received "generally favorable" reviews for most platforms according to Metacritic; the Nintendo 3DS version received "mixed or average" reviews. The Metacritic scores for the game were the highest and most positive of the series on most platforms. Gaming website Quarter to Three gave both the Wii U and Xbox 360 a perfect score of 5/5. Video game website Gaming Age gave the PlayStation 3 version the highest grade of an "A" and further commented that "whether you’re a Skylanders fan or a gamer who’s looking for a charming and unique family-friendly game series to get into, Skylanders Swap Force comes highly recommended."

Skylanders: Trap Team received "generally favorable" reviews for most platforms according to Metacritic; the iOS version received "universal acclaim". However, the scores from Metacritic were slightly lower than that of the previous game on most platforms with the iOS version receiving the highest Metacritic score in the series.

Skylanders: SuperChargers received "generally favorable" reviews according to Metacritic. The scores from Metacritic had some scores that were higher than the previous game, such as the Wii U and PlayStation 4 versions, but some were lower than the previous game, such as the iOS and Xbox One versions. The game was also nominated for two awards: Best Family Game at The Game Awards 2015 and Favorite Video Game at the 2016 Kids' Choice Awards. Despite its positive reception, Activision reported in February 2016 that the game did not meet sales expectations.

Skylanders: Imaginators received "generally favorable" reviews for most platforms according to Metacritic; the Nintendo Switch version received "mixed or average" reviews. Compared to the previous game, the game received lower scores on most platforms except the Xbox One version. Despite the generally positive reception, the game sold only 66,000 copies during its launch month.

As of February 2015, the Skylanders series has crossed the threshold of $3 billion in sales, with 175 million toys sold since 2011, making the series one of the top 20 highest-selling video game franchises of all time. As of June 2015, over 250 million toys were sold. As of 2016, over 300 million toys have been sold and the franchise has become the 11th biggest console franchise of all time.

References

External links 
 
 
 

Activision Blizzard franchises
Activision games
Fictional warrior races
Spyro the Dragon
Superhero teams
Video game franchises
Video game franchises introduced in 2011
Video games adapted into comics
Toys-to-life games
2010s toys